HMS Stevenstone was a  destroyer of the Royal Navy. She was a member of the third subgroup of the class, and saw service in the Second World War. All the ships of this class were named after British fox hunts. She was the first Royal Navy warship with this name, after the Stevenstone hunt in Devon.

In 1946 and 1947 Stevenstone was part of the 3rd Destroyer Flotilla based in the Mediterranean and was repaired in Chatham in 1948. She was subsequently sold for scrap and arrived at the ship breakers in Dunston on 2 September 1959

References

Sources
 Colledge, J. J. & Warlow, Ben, Ships of the Royal Navy: The Complete Record of all Fighting Ships of the Royal Navy from the 15th Century to the Present, Newbury, 2010
 English, John, The Hunts - A history of the design, development and careers of the 86 destroyers of this class built for the Royal and Allied Navies during World War II, Cumbria, 1987  (World Ship Society) 
 Whitley, M. J., Destroyers of World War Two - an international encyclopedia, London, 1988 
 Gardiner, Robert (ed.), Conway's All the World's Fighting Ships 1922–1946, London, 1987

Further reading

Hunt-class destroyers of the Royal Navy
World War II destroyers of the United Kingdom
Ships built on the Isle of Wight
1942 ships